Qualification for the 2011 Little League World Series took place in eight United States regions and eight international regions from June through August 2011.

United States

Great Lakes
The tournament took place in Indianapolis on August 5–13.

Mid-Atlantic
The tournament took place in Bristol, Connecticut on August 5–15.

Midwest
The tournament took place in Indianapolis on August 6–13.

Note: The Dakotas are organized into a single Little League district.

New England
The tournament took place in Bristol, Connecticut on August 5–13.

Northwest
The tournament took place in San Bernardino, California on August 5–13.

Southeast
The tournament took place in Warner Robins, Georgia on August 5–12.

Southwest
The tournament took place in Waco, Texas on August 5–11.

West
The tournament took place in San Bernardino, California on August 5–13.

International

Asia-Pacific
The tournament took place in Guam from July 9–15.

Canada
The tournament took place in North Vancouver, British Columbia on August 6–13.

(*): host league

Caribbean
The tournament took place St. Thomas, US Virgin Islands on July 9–16.

Europe
The tournament took place in Kutno, Poland on July 22–29.

Japan
The first two round of the tournament was held on July 2, and the remaining three rounds were played on July 9. All games were played in Tokyo.

Latin America
The tournament took place in San José, Costa Rica on July 16–23.

Mexico
The tournament took place in Mexicali, Baja California on July 24–30.

Middle East-Africa
The tournament took place in Kutno, Poland on July 13–16.

Notes
Kampala, Uganda won the Middle East-Africa Region, but were denied visas to enter the United States. In order to maintain the 16-team field in the Little League World Series, Little League invited the runners-up of the MEA Region, Dhahran, Saudi Arabia, to participate.

References

2011 Little League World Series